Bziny is a village and municipality in Dolný Kubín District in the Zilina Region of northern Slovakia.

History
In historical records the village was first mentioned in 1345.

Geography
The municipality lies at an altitude of 502 metres and covers an area of 5.842 km². It has a population of about 530 people.

See also
 List of municipalities and towns in Slovakia

References

Genealogical resources

The records for genealogical research are available at the state archive "Statny Archiv in Bytca, Slovakia"

 Roman Catholic church records (births/marriages/deaths): 1787-1896 (parish A)

External links
Surnames of living people in Bziny

Villages and municipalities in Dolný Kubín District